Clark's Harbour is a town on Cape Sable Island in southwestern Nova Scotia, Canada, located in the Municipality of the District of Barrington in Shelburne County. The main industry is lobster fishing. Owing to this as well as the town's history as a fishing community, the town is noted as the birthplace of the Cape Islander fishing boat.

The community is the southernmost town in the province of Nova Scotia, and thus one of the southernmost towns in Canada, being located roughly on a parallel with Bilbao, Basque Country and just north of Rome.

Demographics 

Mother tongue language (2006)

Religious make-up (2001)

Income (2006)

Climate

Clark's Harbour has an oceanic climate (Köppen climate classification Cfb) with milder winters than the mainland. The town has a significant seasonal lag, with September having the warmest year-round lows, as well as having warmer weather in the daytime compared to July.

Economy 

The economy of Clark's Harbour and its surrounding areas is driven largely by the fishing industry and in particular the seasonal lobster fishery. Shelburne County (in which Clark's Harbour is located) is generally accepted as the lobster capital of Nova Scotia (and a nearby sign boasts the claim that it is the Lobster Capital of Canada). The fishery has also given rise to various secondary and tertiary industries such as further seafood processing and packaging, and boatbuilding. Lobster that is trapped by Clark's Harbour fishers is exported around the world, but primarily to the New England market.

There are several other employers in Clark's Harbour, including a general store, a service station, a pizza parlor, and a takeout restaurant. However, the economic impact of these businesses is generally small compared to the fishery.

Public library 

Located at 2648 Main Street in Clark's Harbour, the Clark's Harbour Branch Library is one of the 10 branches of Western Counties Regional Library. It joined the Western Counties Regional Library in July 1971 but it did not have a physical location in Clark's Harbour until the first branch opened on March 4, 1974 . The branch was relocated to its present site as part of the Clark's Harbour Civic Centre on December 11, 2007.

Stone Church 
One of the more notable attractions in Clark's Harbour is the United Baptist Stone Church, which is a popular destination for visitors. It is noted primarily for its unique architecture,

The Stone Church was first started on September 5, 1921, by Lieutenant-Governor MacCallum Grant. The foundation is made of native granite, and three feet in thickness. The granite that was used was all cut by hand using chisels. The walls are made of cobblestones gathered from the shore and surrounding islands. This church is eighty-five feet by fifty-five feet and has a seating capacity of five hundred. The inside of the church is decorated in rich wood, and the windows are stained glass.

Thomas Doucette was given the task of constructing the Stone Church from blueprints. The blueprints were designed by a Halifax architect named S.P. Dumaresq. Doucette began building the church, even though he could not read or write and had the blueprints read to him only once. It took ten years to complete the erection of the church.

See also
 List of municipalities in Nova Scotia

References

External links
Town of Clark's Harbour

Communities in Shelburne County, Nova Scotia
Towns in Nova Scotia
General Service Areas in Nova Scotia
Populated coastal places in Canada
1773 establishments in the British Empire